Trace amine-associated receptor 5 is a protein that in humans is encoded by the TAAR5 gene. In vertebrates, TAAR5 is expressed in the olfactory epithelium.

Human TAAR5 (hTAAR5) is a functional trace amine-associated receptor which acts as an olfactory receptor for tertiary amines. The amber-woody fragrance timberol antagonizes this activity of trimethylamine. 3-Iodothyronamine is an inverse agonist of hTAAR5. Recent studies highlighted the significant role of TAAR5 in the central nervous system and periphery. Beta-galactosidase mapping of TAAR5 expression showed its localization not only in theglomeruli but also in deeper layers of olfactory bulb projecting to the limbic brain olfactorycircuitry. Moreover, TAAR5 knockout mice show increased adult neurogenesis andelevated number of dopamine neurons. Also, it was observed statistically significant changes in osmotic erythrocyte fragility in TAAR5-KO mice.

See also
 Trace amine-associated receptor

References

Further reading

G protein-coupled receptors